Karalar, Kazan is a village in the District of Kazan, Ankara Province, Turkey.

North of the town is the site of the ancient Roman settlement of Mariegordus, where the ruins of a temple and burial mounds can be seen.

References

Villages in Kahramankazan District
Neighbourhoods of Kazan